Satanism is a belief or social phenomenon that features the veneration or admiration of Satan or a similar figure.

Satanism may also refer to:

 LaVeyan Satanism, a non-theistic Satanic religion founded by Anton LaVey
 Church of Satan, a non-theistic Satanic organization dedicated to LaVeyan Satanism
 Theistic Satanism, the worship of Satan as a deity
Joy of Satan, a website and religious group of Theistic Satanists who revere Satan as a sentient and extraterrestrial being.
 Our Lady of Endor Coven, a cult founded by Herbert Arthur Sloane
 The Satanic Temple, a non-theistic Satanic religious organization promoting political activism, secularism, and bodily autonomy
 Satanic ritual abuse, a moral panic that occurred near the end of the 20th century

See also

Satanist (disambiguation)
Satan (disambiguation)